The Radio Club Uruguayo (in English, literally Radio Club of Uruguay) is a national non-profit organization for amateur radio enthusiasts in Uruguay. RCU was founded on August 23, 1933. The RCU operates a QSL bureau for those amateur radio operators in regular contact with amateur radio operators in other countries. Radio Club Uruguayo represents the interests of their associated amateur radio operators in Uruguay before national and international regulatory authorities. RCU is the national member society representing Uruguay in the International Amateur Radio Union.

See also 
International Amateur Radio Union

References 

Uruguay
Organizations based in Montevideo
Organizations established in 1933
1933 establishments in Uruguay
Radio in Uruguay
Pocitos, Montevideo